Solymar is a coastal resort or residential neighbourhood of the Ciudad de la Costa in the Canelones Department of Uruguay. Its name is a contraction of the words "Sun and Sea".

Geography

Location
Solymar borders the coastline of the Río de la Plata to the south, El Bosque and Lagomar to the west, Lomas de Solymar to the east and its northern limit is formed by the highway Ruta Interbalnearia.

History
In 1994, when Ciudad de la Costa took on the status of a city, Solymar was incorporated in it. It borders the resorts Lagomar to the west, El Bosque to the southwest and Lomas de Solymar to the northeast.

Population
In 2011 Solymar had a population of 18,573.

Source: Instituto Nacional de Estadística de Uruguay

Places of worship
 Parish Church of Our Lady of the Foundation (Roman Catholic)

Street map

References

External links
INE map of Solymar, Lomas de Solymar and Colinas de Solymar

Ciudad de la Costa